This is a list of the National Register of Historic Places listings in San Saba County, Texas.

This is intended to be a complete list of properties listed on the National Register of Historic Places in San Saba County, Texas. There are three properties listed on the National Register in the county. One property is both a State Antiquities Landmark and a Recorded Texas Historic Landmark.

Current listings

The locations of National Register properties may be seen in a mapping service provided.

|}

See also

National Register of Historic Places listings in Texas
Recorded Texas Historic Landmarks in San Saba County

References

External links

 
San Saba County